The 2015–16 FC Augsburg season was the club's fifth consecutive season in the Bundesliga and their 47th season overall. They also played in the DFB-Pokal and Europa League.

Competitions

Bundesliga

League table

Results summary

Results by round

Matches

DFB-Pokal

UEFA Europa League

Group stage

Knockout phase

Round of 32

Player information

Transfers

Squad and player statistics

|}

Discipline

References

Augsburg
FC Augsburg seasons
Augsburg